Ecitonidia is a genus of rove beetles in the family Staphylinidae. There is at least one described species in Ecitonidia, E. wheeleri.

References

Further reading

 
 
 
 

Aleocharinae
Articles created by Qbugbot